Robert E. Fuller (born 1 July 1972) is a British wildlife artist best known for his renditions of British fauna, rendered faithfully in oils, acrylic and bronze. He favours a highly detailed, realistic style and counts the RSPCA and the National Trust among his customers.

He travels the world to study birds and animals in their natural habitats, and his paintings sell internationally. His lifelike paintings and sculpture are the result of months spent immersed in the natural habitat of his wild subjects.

In 2015 he turned his focus onto the wildlife living in his garden in north Yorkshire, installing more than 60 surveillance cameras into animal nests and building specific habitats to attract owls, kestrels, stoats, deer, buzzards, pheasants, and weasels into his two-acre garden.

The resulting footage, especially of the behaviour of stoats and weasels, and nest footage of barn owls, has attracted interest from wildlife enthusiasts around the globe and led to appearances on British television. In 2015 his weasel footage was featured on BBC Springwatch, and a BBC Natural Earth documentary on stoats is expected to air in 2019.

Robert Fuller writes a popular blog  about his wildlife watching experiences and is also a freelance journalist. His latest articles include a feature on his intensive five-year research project into the secret lives of the stoats living in his garden for BBC Wildlife Magazine published in April 2019 and a piece on stoats & weasels for BBC Countryfile Magazine in May 2018.

The artist also writes a monthly column in The Yorkshire Post and the York Evening Press in which he shares the stories behind his paintings.

A passionate conservationist, Robert Fuller combines his art with work to preserve the animals and birds to which he owes his livelihood. He uses his paintings to raise funds for conservation and works with conservationists  to foster owls in the wild. He also helps to rehabilitate stoats and weasels for Mustelid Rescue UK.

His regular appearances on British television championing wild creatures near his home and gallery on the Yorkshire Wolds have earned him a reputation as an ambassador for the region's wildlife. As such he appeared on ITV's Calendar, Countryfile on 12 April 2011, BBC Look North and BBC The One Show on 16 January 2013.

In 2011 Fuller was given an award for bravery by the RSPCA after his quick action when he stumbled upon an armed gang of badger baiters and helped secure a successful conviction.

Born in 1972, Fuller moved to Great Givendale, where his father, Richard Fuller, an author and wildlife enthusiast, earned notability for wildlife conservation after winning the Silver Lapwing award for farm conservation.

In 2014, Fuller visited the Galápagos Islands and subsequently painted a series of Galapagos wildlife pieces. These were the focus of the summer exhibition at his gallery and then went on display at The Deep (aquarium) in Hull. He also did a series of school visits in Yorkshire with staff from the Galapagos Conservation Trust.

In 2015, Robert Fuller was visited and interviewed by Julian Clary in an episode of Nature Nuts with Julian Clary, a nature show on ITV.

References

1972 births
Living people
British artists
Wildlife artists